The Dumont Public Schools are a comprehensive community public school district that serves students in pre-kindergarten through twelfth grade from Dumont, in Bergen County, New Jersey, United States.

As of the 2020–21 school year, the district, comprised of five schools, had an enrollment of 2,540 students and 208.0 classroom teachers (on an FTE basis), for a student–teacher ratio of 12.2:1.

The district is classified by the New Jersey Department of Education as being in District Factor Group "FG", the fourth-highest of eight groupings. District Factor Groups organize districts statewide to allow comparison by common socioeconomic characteristics of the local districts. From lowest socioeconomic status to highest, the categories are A, B, CD, DE, FG, GH, I and J.

History
Genevieve Via Cava, a former special education teacher for the district, bequeathed the school district $1 million after her 2011 death. She retired from teaching in 1990 and had no remaining immediate family. The donation was revealed in 2018.

Schools 
Schools in the district (with 2020–21 enrollment data from the National Center for Education Statistics) are:
Elementary schools
Grant School with 390 students in grades K-5 (opened 1911)
Sheri Weinstein, Principal
Honiss School with 632 students in grades K-8 (opened 1955)
Dr. Karen Bennett, Principal
Lincoln School with 156 students in grades K-5 (opened 1911)
Luis D. Lopez, Principal
Selzer School with 500 students in grades PreK-8 (opened 1960)
Jacqueline J. Bello, Principal
High school
Dumont High School with 788 students in grades 9-12 (opened 1932)
James Wichmann, Principal

Administration 
Core members of the schools administration are:
 Maria Poidomani, Superintendent
 Kevin Cartotto, Business Administrator / Board Secretary

Board of education
The district's board of education, comprised of nine members, sets policy and oversees the fiscal and educational operation of the district through its administration. As a Type II school district, the board's trustees are elected directly by voters to serve three-year terms of office on a staggered basis, with three seats up for election each year held (since 2012) as part of the November general election. The board appoints a superintendent to oversee the district's day-to-day operations and a business administrator to supervise the business functions of the district.

References

External links 
 Dumont Public Schools
 
 Dumont Public Schools, National Center for Education Statistics

Dumont, New Jersey
New Jersey District Factor Group FG
School districts in Bergen County, New Jersey